The following radio stations broadcast on FM frequency 97.6 MHz:

Italy
 Radio Torre Macauda (Sciacca)

Malaysia
 Hitz in Johor Bahru, Johor and Singapore
 Hot FM in Klang Valley, West Pahang and South Perak.
 Buletin FM in Taiping, Perak (Coming Soon)

Turkey
TRT-2 at Gaziantep

United Kingdom
Heart East at Chiltern
Free Radio Herefordshire & Worcestershire at Hereford

References

Lists of radio stations by frequency